Parkdale railway station is located on the Frankston line in Victoria, Australia. It serves the south-eastern Melbourne suburb of Parkdale, and it opened on 1 September 1919.

History

Opening on 1 September 1919, Parkdale station, like the suburb itself, was named after W. Parker, an early landowner in the area.

A disused signal box is located at the Frankston (Down) end of Platform 1. It was abolished in 1986, when boom barriers replaced interlocked gates at the Parkers Road level crossing, also located at the Down end of the station.

On 4 May 2010, as part of the 2010/2011 State Budget, $83.7 million was allocated to upgrade Parkdale to a Premium Station, along with nineteen others. However, in March 2011, this was scrapped by the Baillieu Government.

On 29 July 2021, the Level Crossing Removal Project announced that the level crossing will be grade separated by 2025. The project will involve building a rail bridge over the road, and will include rebuilding the station.

Platforms and services

Parkdale has two side platforms. It is serviced by Metro Trains' Frankston line services.

Platform 1:
  all stations and limited express services to Flinders Street, Werribee and Williamstown

Platform 2:
  all stations services to Frankston

Transport links

Ventura Bus Lines operates one route via Parkdale station, under contract to Public Transport Victoria:
 : Hampton station – Carrum station

Gallery

References

External links
 Melway map at street-directory.com.au

Railway stations in Melbourne
Railway stations in Australia opened in 1919
Railway stations in the City of Kingston (Victoria)